Michael van Praag (born 28 September 1947) is a Dutch football administrator and former referee. He was the President of the Royal Dutch Football Association since 27 August 2008 to December 2019 and a Vice President of the UEFA since 30 June 2015. Van Praag previously served as Chairman of AFC Ajax from 1989 until 2003.

Career 

Van Praag was born in Amsterdam. He was Chairman of AFC Ajax from 1989 until mid-2003. His father, Jaap van Praag, was also Chairman of the Amsterdam club from 1964 until 1978. Originally Van Praag was a referee in the Amateur football leagues of the Netherlands and he later made his fortune with his franchise electronic stores that were situated in various airports before he became the chairman of the club.

The period in which Van Praag was Chairman of the club was one of the most successful in the club's history, second only to the tenure served by his father. Ajax won the UEFA Cup in 1992, and the UEFA Champions League and the Intercontinental Cup titles in 1995 under Van Praag's administration. On 27 August 2008 he was chosen as the new chairman of the Royal Dutch Football Association (KNVB) succeeding the previous chairman Jeu Sprengers who had died in April. His predecessor during his tenure at AFC Ajax was Ton Harmsen and he was succeeded by John Jaakke.

Van Praag is a member of the Executive Committee of UEFA, the Chairman of the association's Club Competitions Committee and is a Deputy Chairman of the HatTrick Committee. He and his father are the only father and son chairmen combination to have both led their club to continental success with Ajax winning a combined four European championships under their guidance.

FIFA and UEFA presidential bids

On 26 January 2015, Van Praag announced his intention to run against incumbent Sepp Blatter in the 2015 FIFA presidential election. Van Praag stated, "I am very worried about the deteriorating situation at FIFA. The public opinion, the trustworthiness, is very bad, and with me a lot of people in the world believe so." He was seen as a consensus and reliable candidate, supporting a limitation of the powers attributed to the FIFA President. He campaigned on the publication of the Garcia Report and a new Executive Committee vote if the 2022 World Cup attribution corruption allegations were to be proved. He also advocated for less bureaucracy in Zurich and a regulation of workers' conditions in football stadiums. He stated he would not seek reelection if elected.

On 21 May 2015, just a few days before the elections, he announced his withdrawal from FIFA presidential race to support Ali bin Hussein, stating he believed he had the best shot at the presidency. Candidate Luís Figo did the same. Blatter was however reelected, although he had to resign four days after the election because of corruption allegations.

Later that year, he became Vice President of the UEFA, named by President Michel Platini. On 14 September 2016, Van Praag received 13 votes in the election of the vacant office of UEFA President, losing to Aleksander Čeferin who got 42 votes.

Family 
Michael van Praag comes from a prominent family in the Netherlands of entertainers and business people. Unlike his father, he is not officially Jewish since his mother was not. He has three sisters; Peggy, Pamela and TV Host and Actor . The famous singer  is his uncle whose children, former newsreader Marga van Praag and her brother  are his cousins.

See also
List of Jews in sports (non-players)

References

External links
 

1947 births
Living people
People's Party for Freedom and Democracy politicians
Presidents of the Royal Dutch Football Association
Members of the UEFA Executive Committee
AFC Ajax chairmen and investors
Dutch football referees
Dutch corporate directors
Dutch people of Jewish descent
Businesspeople from Amsterdam
Sportspeople from Amsterdam
20th-century Dutch people
Dutch sports executives and administrators